Marc Vallhonesta Carreras (born 3 December 1986), commonly known as Vallho, is a Catalan professional footballer who plays for CF Peralada as a central defender.

Club career
Born in Sils, Girona, Catalonia, Vallho graduated from local Girona FC's youth system, and made his senior debut on 24 April 2005, starting in a 0–1 home loss against CA Osasuna B in the Segunda División B. He later appeared for lower league clubs in his native region.

In the 2009 summer, Vallho moved to UE Llagostera, freshly promoted to the Tercera División. In 2011, after the club's promotion to the Segunda B, he renewed his link and remained as a starter during the following campaigns.

Vallho appeared in 41 matches during the 2013–14 season, as the Unió were promoted to the Segunda División for the first time ever. He made his debut as a professional on 23 August 2014, aged 27, starting in a 0–2 away loss against UD Las Palmas.

On 9 July 2015, Vallho rescinded his contract with the Blanquivermells.

References

External links

1986 births
Living people
People from Selva
Sportspeople from the Province of Girona
Spanish footballers
Footballers from Catalonia
Association football defenders
Segunda División players
Segunda División B players
Tercera División players
Girona FC players
UE Costa Brava players
UE Olot players
CF Peralada players